The 1955 McMurry Indians football team represented McMurry College—now known as McMurry University—as a member of the Texas Conference during the 1955 college football season. Led by Douglas Cox in his first and only season as head coach, the Indians compiled an overall record of 8–2 with a mark of 2–0 in conference play, winning the Texas Conference title.

Schedule

References

McMurry
McMurry War Hawks football seasons
McMurry Indians football